Mark Newman is an American sculptor and illustrator. He graduated with honors from the Academy of Art University in San Francisco, CA in 1986 with a degree in Illustration. He started his company, Mark Newman Sculpture Inc. in 1997 and has done work for Bowen Designs, Department 56, Hallmark, Sideshow Collectibles, Premium Collectibels Studio, Spirit Halloween Stores, Lenox, Inc. Terry Smith Creations and Toy Genius among others. He was the lead sculptor for Thomas Blackshears 'Ebony Visions' line of figurines for 18 years.
Newman created special effects for film. He designed and sculpted character design maquettes of 'Hogsqueal' and 'Thimbletack' for Tippett Studio for the film The Spiderwick Chronicles and character design maquettes for video game companies such as DreamWorks and Electronic Arts and Sony. He has also created bronze statues for Stanford University and 2 bronze fireplace facades for George Lucas and Skywalker Ranch. Mark has been assisting Andrew Cawrse of Anatomy Tools in his level 2 anatomy sculpting workshops in Las Vegas since 2010.

References

Living people
American sculptors
Year of birth missing (living people)
Academy of Art University alumni